There's a Star Above the Manger Tonight is the fourth and final studio album by Red Red Meat, released in 1997 by Sub Pop.

Track listing

Vinyl Reissue Jealous Butcher Bonus Tracks Cat. No. JB114 RELEASE DATE 10/21/2014

Personnel
Adapted from the There's a Star Above the Manger Tonight liner notes.

Red Red Meat
 Brian Deck – synthesizer, drums, percussion, vocals, engineering, mixing
 Tim Hurley – bass guitar, lap steel guitar, synthesizer, berimbau, vocals
 Ben Massarella – drums
 Tim Rutili – guitar, mandolin, violin, piano, vocals, art direction

Additional musicians
 Jeremy Jacobsen – marimba, organ
 Matt Fields – vocals
 Casey Rice – effects
 Rick Rizzo – guitar
Production and additional personnel
 Jeff Kleinsmith – design
 Red Red Meat – production

Release history

References

External links 
 

1997 albums
Red Red Meat albums
Sub Pop albums